Rose Hill is an unincorporated community in Covington County, Alabama, United States.

History
The community name may come from a personal name or an environmental name. A post office operated under the name Rose Hill from 1855 to 1906.

Company F of the 33rd Regiment Alabama Infantry was organized at Brandon's Store in Rose Hill.

References

Unincorporated communities in Covington County, Alabama
Unincorporated communities in Alabama